Piła Voivodeship was a voivodeship (unit of administrative division and local government) in Poland from 1975 to 1998. It was superseded by the Greater Poland Voivodeship. The Voivodeship's capital city was Piła.

Major cities and towns (population in 1995)
 Piła (75,700)
 Wałcz (27,000)
 Wągrowiec (24,100)
 Chodzież (20,400)

Former administrative regions of Greater Poland
Former voivodeships of Poland (1975–1998)